Pax airship disaster was the explosion of the  airship on May 12, 1902, in Paris, which killed the Brazilian inventor Augusto Severo and the French mechanic .

History

Background
Its inventor, Augusto Severo, had already been studying aeronautics for 20 years and invested all the rest of his fortune in Pax. Originally the airship would have an electric motor, but due to the time it would take to develop it and the obligation to return to Brazil to fulfill his parliamentary term, Severo was convinced to follow the example of Santos Dumont and adopt gasoline engines, whose usage he was hesitant to even five days before the flight.

The Pax was completed a fortnight before the accident, with experiments being conducted in an Earth-tethered manner and in a complicated weather situation on May 4 in Vaugirard park, with satisfactory results, which led the inventor to proceed with a crewed flight.

In the following days the weather conditions made further experiments difficult, but at midnight on May 12 he began filling the balloon, complete at 5 a.m. Before starting the flight, Severo announces that Brazil would learn of his success on the anniversary of the Golden Law and presents his plans for the airship Jesus, which would be 100 meters long and with which he would cross the Atlantic. As a way of saving weight, Severo left Alvaro Reis on the ground, going up only with his mechanic Georges Sachet, who had never made an ascent before.

For twenty minutes Severo flies with the airship Earth-tethered, trying out its maneuverability. He lands, talks to friends and family, and at 5:25 in the morning resumes his flight. No longer Earth-tethered, the airship demonstrates difficulty with its maneuvering. For 15 minutes the aeronaut fought the wind, but the 40 hp engine was not powerful enough in these conditions.

Explosion
The airship , piloted by 42-year-old Augusto Severo and 28-year-old mechanic , exploded at 5:40 a.m. on May 12, 1902, with its wreckage falling onto Maine Avenue, killing its occupants.

The flame engulfed the engine, soon enveloping the entire aircraft. The wreckage fell in front of house n. 79, on Maine Avenue, with the nacelle where the aeronauts were located going through the ceiling and ending up inside a couple's bedroom, whose bed was on the opposite side of the room, saving the lives of the residents who were sleeping at the time.

Cause of the accident
Colonel Rénard, soon after the explosion, opined that the accident was caused by the use of the combustion engine. Henri Lachambre believed that the mechanical parts had been twisted and the fire had gone from the carburetor to the reservoir and from there to the gas exhaust valve. Astronomer Albert Charbonneaux, from the Meudon observatory, investigated the wreckage and, among other things, pointed to a short circuit in the engine's electrical part as the cause of the disaster.

Santos Dumont considered it imprudent to place the engines so close to the balloon, but initially said he didn't believe they were the cause of the accident. He pointed out that only one of the two valves above the second engine was working. Santos Dumont pointed out that a valve was closed with wax by the aeronaut and that, under flight conditions, the balloon was unable to withstand the internal pressure, and that the main error was that they dropped ballast when they noticed that the airship was rising, which allowed the aircraft to climb with more speed.

In an article published in September of the same year, Santos Dumont pointed out that the engine was a mere three feet from the envelope, which made the aircraft accident-prone. The Scientific Committee of the French Aeroclub finally decided that the accident was caused by the proximity of the engine to the balloon's exhaust valve and that under these conditions, Pax would not be accepted into the Aeroclub's competitions.

Consequences
Severo died seconds after impact. Both aeronauts suffered extremely violent injuries. Augusto Severo's body was taken from the hangar to his home at 9 a.m. that same day, while that of mechanic Georges Sachet remained at the police station until his mother arrived.

The vicinity of the wreckage was soon surrounded by witnesses. Commander Rénard carried the remains of the airship back to the hangar. Fifty police officers closed the streets, thus enabling the removal of the wreckage. , former Minister of Transportation, telegraphed President Campos Salles, asking that Congress vote on Severo's funeral and grant a pension to his widow. The entire French aviation community went to the crash site and a committee from the French Aeroclub brought their condolences to Augusto Severo's widow.

Before its transport to Brazil, the coffin was buried at the Passy cemetery in Paris on May 17, 1902. Augusto Severo's body arrived in Rio de Janeiro on June 17, and was buried the next day, with the participation of President Campos Salles.

Legacy
In September 1902, it was decided to name two streets in Brazil with the names of the aeronauts. The following year a tombstone was placed at the site of the accident and a bust of Severo was placed in the cemetery in Paris. The accident was depicted in the short film The Catastrophe of the Balloon "Le Pax" by director Georges Méliès. In 1903 a memorial service for the victims took place in Paris. In 1952 a tribute was held by friends of the Brazilian inventor in his memory. In 2019 a bill was introduced to inscribe his name in the Book of Heroes of the Patherland. 120 years after his death, in 2022, Augusto Severo's remains were transported from Rio de Janeiro to Rio Grande do Norte, his birthplace.

References

Bibliography

(Organized by date)

1902 in France
Aviation accidents and incidents in 1902
Accidents and incidents involving balloons and airships